Ingleside may refer to:

Australia 

Ingleside, New South Wales, a suburb of Sydney, Australia
Ingleside, Queensland, a neighbourhood in City of Gold Coast

Canada 

Ingleside, Ontario, a town in Ontario, Canada

United States 

Ingleside, San Francisco, California
Ingleside (Safety Harbor, Florida), listed on the National Register of Historic Places (NRHP)
Ingleside, Illinois
Ingleside, Kentucky
Ingleside, Louisiana
Ingleside, Maryland
Ingleside (Catonsville, Maryland), a former historic house
Ingleside, Massachusetts
Ingleside, Nebraska
Ingleside, New York
Ingleside (Alexandria Bay, New York), NRHP-listed
Ingleside, North Carolina
Ingleside (Iron Station, North Carolina), NRHP-listed
Ingleside (Spartanburg County, South Carolina), a formerly NRHP-listed house in Spartanburg County, South Carolina
Ingleside, Texas
Ingleside, Norfolk, Virginia
Ingleside (Washington, D.C.), NRHP-listed
Ingleside (Amelia Courthouse, Virginia), NRHP-listed
Ingleside (Oak Grove, Virginia), NRHP-listed
Ingleside (Ridgeway, Virginia), NRHP-listed
Ingleside, West Virginia

Transportation
 Ingleside Line

See also
Ingleside on the Bay, Texas
Naval Station Ingleside, Ingleside, Texas